Miss America is a documentary film directed by Lisa Ades that chronicle the Miss America pageant from its very beginnings in 1921 to the present-day pageant.

The documentary was released as an episode of American Experience season 14 in January 2002.

Premise 
The documentary explores how the Miss America pageant has reflected the country’s views and where the country was moving towards by whom it chose as its winners each year. As the categories became more substantial and the requirements to participate more rigorous, the Miss America Pageant became much more than just a national contest to be America’s female representative to the world. The pageant, hosted in Atlantic City every year since it started, transformed into a place where sexual politics as well as the position of women were subtly fought and battles against antisemitism and racism were won.

Commentary cast
Julia Alvarez is an author who has written many books, poems, novels and essays. She was also awarded the 2009 F. Scott Fitzgerald Award for Outstanding Achievement in American Literature among other notable achievements. Margaret Cho has many occupations, but is best known as a comedian through which she tackles social and political issues. William Goldman is a novelist, screenwriter, and playwright and has won two Academy Awards. Isaac Mizrahi, although known for his fashion, is also a TV presenter and creative director of Xcel Brands. Gloria Steinem is a writer and an activist and founded Ms. magazine among many other organizations and foundations. Steinem has also been inducted into the National Women’s Hall of Fame in Seneca Falls, NY and was awarded the Presidential Medal of Freedom by President Barack Obama.

Interviewed pageant winners
Bess Myerson won Miss America in 1945 and, after refusing to change her name, became the first Jewish Miss America in the same year that World War II ended. Lee Meriwether won Miss America in 1955 and was nominated for two Golden Globe Awards and an Emmy Award for her acting career following Miss America. Mary Ann Mobley won Miss America in 1959. After continuing on to acting, Mobley was awarded the Golden Globe Award for New Star of the Year-Actress in 1965 and the Outstanding Young Woman of the Year Award by Claudia “Lady Bird” Johnson in 1966.

Behind the scenes crew
Miss America was directed and produced by Lisa Ades who has won an award for another TV series, New York: A Documentary Film. Lisa Ades has directed and produced a number of other documentary films for television. Co-producer Lesli Klainberg has won awards for her directing and producing her own documentaries and has recently taken the position of executive director of the Film Society of Lincoln Center. Writer Michelle Ferrari has received honors for her other works from the Writers Guild of America and the Robert F. Kennedy Journalism Awards as well as others. Editor Toby Shimin has worked on multiple award-winning films and documentaries in addition to co-founding the editing and production company Dovetail Films. Award winner Cherry Jones narrated Miss America. She has also been on Broadway and in multiple films and television episodes.

Festivals
Sundance Film Festival
South by Southwest Film Festival
Full Frame Documentary Film Festival
Sheffield Doc/Fest

Critical reception
“Refreshingly evenhanded, ‘Miss America’ tackles the pageant’s intersection with race, sex and women’s liberation—among other things—without sinking into gratuitous pageant-bashing.” (John Curran, Lexington Herald-Ledger)
“... this critical but balanced American Experience documentary acknowledges the pageant’s status as a national institution.”  (Review by Terry Kelleher, People)
“‘Miss America’ [is] a film that may be the definitive documentary of the pageant.” (Review by Charlie McCollum, San Jose Mercury News)
“PBS' Miss America is the model of brevity, covering 80 years and the changing role of women in under two hours.” (Hal Boedeker, The Anniston Star)
“There's an abundance of feminine icons and anti-female outrages in Miss America, the outstanding beauty-pageant history by award-winning documentarian Lisa Ades.” (Peter Howell, The Toronto Star)

References

External links
Miss America at Women Make Movies
Film Website: Miss America on PBS

2002 films
American Experience
Documentary films about beauty pageants
American documentary films
2000s English-language films
2000s American films